The River Mert; anciently, the Lycastus is a river in Turkey which flows into the Black Sea at Samsun.

History
The ancient town of Lycastus in Pontus was located on the river; the site has not been located.

Pollution
A local politician claims the river suffers from domestic and industrial pollution, and fish die off in 2014 is being investigated by local officials.

Flooding
In 2012 flooding killed 5 people.

References

Samsun
Rivers of Turkey
Landforms of Samsun Province